The Manpower Services Commission (MSC) was a non-departmental public body of the Department of Employment Group in the United Kingdom created by Edward Heath's Conservative Government in 1973. The MSC had a remit to co-ordinate employment and training services in the UK through a ten-member commission drawn from industry, trade unions, local authorities and education interests. This was an example of the contemporary corporatist influence on British economic policy.  With three executive agencies, the Employment Services Division, the Training Services Division and the Special Programmes Division, the body was led by Geoffrey Holland of the Policy and Planning Division under the overall management of Sir John Cassells.

The Policy and Planning Division was initially based in Selkirk House, High Holborn, London and later moved to Moorfoot in Sheffield.  At Selkirk House a team of Policy makers took responsibility for putting Geoffrey Holland's 'Young People and Work' report of 1977 which created the Youth Opportunities Programme (YOP) and the Job Creation Programme (JCP) intruded to ameliorate the problems facing the young and not so young workers following high unemployment in the UK during the early to mid-seventies.  'You can't get a job without experience, and you can't get experience without a job' was the catch phrase of the time.

YOP had its critics and bad press especially for its work experience programme where several companies were accused of manipulating the system to get their 'free boy or girl' for six months.  However, there were some notable successes including the development of the information technology centres (ITECs) which started in Notting Hill, London, giving young, disaffected youths the chance to explore the budding information technology industry.  Many young people were initially attracted by the electronics side, especially with music sound systems being popular at the time.  They were encouraged to venture into computer programming by gaming first, and then understanding how the programmes worked and could be improved.

The MSC also created the Training Opportunities Scheme (TOPS) which in 1985-6 gave way to the Job Training Programme.

The MSC was to become closely associated with its management of the Youth Training Scheme and various other training programmes intended to help alleviate the high levels of unemployment in the 1980s. After 1987 the MSC lost functions and was briefly re-branded the Training Agency (TA), before being replaced by a network of 72 training and enterprise councils.

See also
 Moorfoot Building, Sheffield, formerly known as the Manpower Services Commission building

References

External links
 Employment And Training Act 1973

Education in England
Defunct non-departmental public bodies of the United Kingdom government
20th century in the United Kingdom
1973 establishments in the United Kingdom